Podgor or Podgór may refer to:

 Podgor, Montenegro, a village
 Podgór, Poland, a village